Spencer Station is an unincorporated community in Millwood Township, Guernsey County, in the U.S. state of Ohio.

History
Spencer Station was platted in 1892 when the railroad was extended to that point.

References

Unincorporated communities in Guernsey County, Ohio
Unincorporated communities in Ohio